Yongcui Township is a township in Nanjian Yi Autonomous County, Yunnan, China.

Administrative division
As of 2018, the town is divided into seven villages: 
 Yongcui
 Longfeng
 Anli
 Shengli
 Wenquan
 Jiumajie
 Xinhua

History
During the Great Leap Forward, it known as "Yongcui Commune" in 1958. It was incorporated as a township in 1988.

Geography
The township is situated at central Nanjian Yi Autonomous County. It borders Nanjian Town in the north, Baohua Town in the east, Gonglang Town in the south, and Leqiu Township and Bixi Township in the west.

The highest point is Anlixin Mountain, elevation .

Economy
The region's economy is based on agriculture and animal husbandry. The region mainly produce tea, tobacco, and Juglans sigillata. The region also has an abundance of copper, nickel and iron.

Demographics

As of 2020, the National Bureau of Statistics of China estimates the township's population now to be 20,805.

Transportation
The township is crossed by the China National Highway G214 and the Shanghai–Nanjing Expressway.

References

Bibliography

Divisions of Nanjian Yi Autonomous County